For over a century, hypnosis has been a popular theme in fiction – literature, film, and television. It features in movies almost from their inception and more recently has been depicted in television and online media. As Harvard hypnotherapist Deirdre Barrett points out in 'Hypnosis in Popular Media', the vast majority of these depictions are negative stereotypes of either control for criminal profit and murder or as a method of seduction. Others depict hypnosis as all-powerful or even a path to supernatural powers.

This article only lists stories in which hypnosis is featured as an important element.

Written works
 Edgar Allan Poe, "The Facts in the Case of M. Valdemar" (1845) about a mesmerist who puts a man in a suspended hypnotic state at the moment of death.
 Ambrose Bierce's story "The Realm of the Unreal" (1890) pivots on the idea of a very long hypnosis. The protagonist is supposed to be able to keep "a peculiarly susceptible subject in the realm of the unreal for weeks, months, and even years, dominated by whatever delusions and hallucinations the operator may from time to time suggest".
 Ambrose Bierce, "The Hypnotist" (1893), in which the narrator glibly relates his use of hypnosis in committing a variety of crimes.
 George du Maurier, Trilby (1894), in which a tone-deaf girl is hypnotized and turned into a singer.
 Bolesław Prus, Pharaoh (1895), in which a Chaldean is hypnotized in a circus act (chapter 33) and High Priest Mefres gives post-hypnotic suggestions to the Greek, Lykon, in chapters 63 and 66 and passim.
 Thomas Mann, Mario and the Magician (1930), relates the effect of a hypnotist on a mass audience.  The story is said to be symbolic of the power of Fascism.
 Cigars of the Pharaoh (1934)
 Richard Condon, The Manchurian Candidate (1959), in which an American soldier is put into a hypnotic trance to implement an assassination plot.  There have been two film versions, in 1962 and 2004.
 Dean Koontz, False Memory (1999)
 Georgia Byng, Molly Moon's Incredible Book of Hypnotism (2002).
 Lucas Hyde, Hypnosis (2005).
 Donald K. Hartman, Death by Suggestion: An Anthology of 19th and Early 20th-Century Tales of Hypnotically Induced Murder, Suicide, and Accidental Death. Gathers together twenty-two short stories from the 19th and early 20th century where hypnotism is used to cause death—either intentionally or by accident. (2018)
Donald K. Hartman, The Hypno-Ripper: Or, Jack the Hypnotically Controlled Ripper; Containing Two Victorian Era Tales Dealing with Jack the Ripper and Hypnotism (2021)
 Allison Jones, "A Hypnotic Suggestion" (2009), has a forensic hypnotherapist as the protagonist.
 Madelaine Lawrence, "Why Kill A Parapsychologist?" (2011), a sequel to "A Hypnotic Suggestion".  Madelaine Lawrence is the other's real name.  More books are expected in this series about a forensic hypnotherapist.
 Lars Kepler (pseudonym), The Hypnotist (2011), in which a hypnotist attempts to recover lost memories from the witness to a murder.
 David Stuart Davies, The Instrument of Death (2019), in which Sherlock Holmes battles master hypnotist Dr. Caligari, who controls a homeless man to commit murders.

Film
 The Cabinet of Dr. Caligari (1920), a German silent horror film in which the main character is a master hypnotist.
 Dr. Mabuse, the Gambler (1922)
 Dracula (1931)
 Svengali (1931)
 Thirteen Women (1932)
 The Mummy (1932)
 Rasputin and the Empress (1932), Rasputin is a hypnotist.
 The Testament of Dr. Mabuse (1933)
 Dracula's Daughter (1936)  
 Cat People (1942)
 The Climax (1944)
 Spellbound (1945)  Starring Ingrid Bergman as a psychotherapist and Gregory Peck as her amnesiac patient.
 The Woman in Green (1945), an American Sherlock Holmes film starring Basil Rathbone as Holmes and Nigel Bruce as Dr. Watson, with Hillary Brooke as "the woman in green" and Henry Daniell as Holmes' arch-enemy, Professor Moriarty. 
 Road to Rio (1947), starring Bing Crosby, Bob Hope, and Dorothy Lamour.
 Sleep, My Love (1948)
 The Pirate (1948), an MGM musical starring Gene Kelly and Judy Garland, in which Kelly's character hypnotizes Garland's character into a trance, freeing her spirit to reveal her fantasies and desires.
 Black Magic (1949), starring Orson Welles.
 The Three Faces of Eve (1957)
 Night of the Demon (1957), starring Dana Andrews.
 The Thousand Eyes of Dr. Mabuse (1960)
 The Manchurian Candidate (1962), based on Richard Condon's 1959 novel The Manchurian Candidate (see "Written works").
 Freud: The Secret Passion (1962)
 The Ipcress File (1965), a British espionage film directed by Sidney J. Furie and starring Michael Caine. The screenplay was based on Len Deighton's 1962 novel, The IPCRESS File. In the story, Harry Palmer (the secret agent portrayed by Caine) is caught by the enemy and subjected to brainwashing through torture and hypnosis.
 Pharaoh (1966), a Polish feature-film adaptation of Bolesław Prus' novel Pharaoh (see "Written works").
 Bram Stoker's Dracula (1973)
 The Exorcist (1973)
 Heart of Glass (1976), written, directed and produced by Werner Herzog, in which almost all the actors perform while under hypnosis.
 Telefon (1977), an American espionage / crime drama starring Charles Bronson, Lee Remick and Donald Pleasence, in which brainwashed Russian sleeper agents in USA during the Cold War must be stopped from mindlessly attacking government interests when they hear certain post-hypnotic trance trigger codes. Trigger commands which activate the agents centre around words from a Robert Frost poem, Stopping by Woods on a Snowy Evening.
 In The Element of Crime (1984), directed by Lars von Trier, an English detective named Fisher, who has become an expatriate living in Cairo, undergoes hypnosis in order to recall his last case.
 The Naked Gun (1988)
 Dead Again (1991), a psychological thriller/neo-noir directed by Kenneth Branagh.  The character Frank (Derek Jacobi) regresses his patients using hypnosis.
 Bram Stoker's Dracula (1992)
 Candyman film series (1992-2020): a horror psychological thriller in which the titular supernatural villain Candyman hypnotizes some of his victims who deny his existence by summoning him. He possesses some of his victims with mind control and a trance-like psychotic state, framing them as they carry out his murders.
 Hocus Pocus (1993)
 The Shadow (1994)
 Dracula: Dead and Loving It (1995)
 Batman & Robin (1997)
Cure (1997)
 In Good Will Hunting (1997), Will Hunting undergoes attempted hypnotherapy, poking fun at the process by producing ridiculous answers to the therapist's questions.
 Stir of Echoes (1999): after being hypnotized, Tom Witzky begins to see haunting visions of a girl's ghost, and a mystery begins to unfold around her.
  The Adventures of Rocky and Bullwinkle (2000)
 In Zoolander (2001), Derek Zoolander is hypnotized to Mugatu's song "Relax" to kill the Prime Minister of Malaysia.
 In Donnie Darko (2001), the titular character undergoes hypnosis in an attempt to locate the root of his mental difficulties.
 Office Space (2001), in which the protagonist is hypnotized in order to relieve stress and burnout; his hypnotist has a heart attack and dies before he is brought out of the trance.
 The Curse of the Jade Scorpion (2001) by Woody Allen.
 In Shallow Hal (2001), Hal Larson is hypnotized by Tony Robbins into seeing people as their inner beauty instead of their external selves.
 In K-PAX (2001), a man claiming to be an extraterrestrial from a planet called "K-PAX", named Prot (pronounced like the word "goat", played by Kevin Spacey), is hypnotized by psychiatrist Mark Powell (Jeff Bridges).
 The Manchurian Candidate (2004), based on Richard Condon's 1959 novel The Manchurian Candidate (see "Written works").
 The Hypnotist (2012), Lasse Hallström's Swedish-language film adaption of a Lars Kepler psychological crime novel, centering on a professional hypnotherapist, overtly suggesting potential benefits of hypnotherapy for criminal detective work, but also its dangerous potential for damaged persons. The film's subtext hints at potentials of hypnosis for abuse and crime, including murder. This theme, less explicitly and in less focused fashion than in The Manchurian Candidate, is examined within a less organised social context.
 Trance (2013), a Danny Boyle film in which Simon Newton (James McAvoy), an extremely suggestible individual, is hypnotized on repeated occasions by therapist Elizabeth Lamb (Rosario Dawson) in order to recover the memory of a stolen painting's location.
 Get Out (2017), the Armitage family transplant the brains of white people into black people's bodies; hypnosis is used to banish the conscious mind of the host into "the sunken place", where they are conscious but powerless.

Television
 In the British series New Tricks, series (season) 6, episode 5, “Magic Majestic,” the team investigates a case where a woman who killed her husband may have been influenced by the script used to hypnotize her. As a demonstration of the power of suggestion, a friendly magician hypnotizes Gerry. Cut to black, Gerry cannot remember what he did and they won't tell him. During the investigation, a suspect uses hypnosis to torment Brian, but the real villain is eventually caught—or is he? In the end, at the pub, Gerry inadvertently plays the music that triggers him. His colleagues cry “Noooooo!”—and the credits roll.
 In the Canadian series Murdoch Mysteries, series (season) 3 episode 5, “Me, Myself and Murdoch” hypnosis plays an important role in a murder case where a woman suspected of killing her father manifests dissociative identity disorder. 
 In the TV series Pokémon, Hypnosis is a move which causes a sleep-induced trance, causing the target to fall asleep or allowing temporary mind control or even a hallucination. Two Pokémon, Drowzee and its evolved form Hypno are known as The Hypnosis Pokémon. Drowzee's name is a reference to feeling drowsy and its ability put someone to sleep. Hypno always carries a pendulum, although this is more of a reference to stage hypnosis.
 In the CBS TV series The Mentalist, the main character Patrick Jane is a former TV psychic and uses hypnosis on several characters. An episode of the show dealt with several hypnotists, one of whom was a murderer, who use their abilities several times during the course of the episode.
 The Showtime Network television show Penn & Teller: Bullshit!, which features comedy duo Penn & Teller, took a skeptical look at hypnosis in one of their episodes. They took the view that the so-called hypnotic trance does not exist at all, and that all hypnosis sessions are merely voluntary shared fantasies. Penn and Teller also state that the unusual behaviors people exhibit during a hypnosis session have always been well within their reach.
The Paramount-syndicated television show The Montel Williams Show featured a presentation by Boris Cherniak where hypnotized subjects reacted to a variety of comical situations, while at the same time showcasing the therapeutic effects of hypnosis such as quitting smoking.
 The popular British car show Top Gear featured one of its presenters, Richard Hammond, under the effects of hypnosis (courtesy of Paul McKenna). Once hypnotized, he underwent several mental changes. Believing he was unable to drive a car (confused when presented with an Alfa Romeo to take around the test track), and thinking that a miniature child's pedal version of a Porsche 911 was his own and a properly functional car. Even imitating its engine noise. Driving it around the studio floor, he threw a minor tantrum when Jeremy Clarkson purposely crashed into it, driving a similar pedal operated Jeep Cherokee.
 An episode of the television series MythBusters examines hypnosis, attempting to ascertain if post-hypnotic suggestion could influence the actions of a subject against their will and/or be used to improve memory. The conclusion was that hypnosis did not alter their behaviour, but was based on unnamed author published 'self-hypnosis' CDs of indiscernible quality or expertise. However the show did in fact find hypnosis increased the ability to recall details of a staged incident during their investigation.
 In an episode of Doug, Dr. Klotzenstein hypnotizes children into eating junk food, and Quailman must save the day.
 In the animated TV series Futurama, a recurring character is the Hypnotoad. He is first seen in the episode The Day the Earth Stood Stupid having hypnotized the judges of a dog show, enabling him to win. In a later episode, he is shown to have his own popular television show, Everybody Loves Hypnotoad.
 In the BBC science fiction series Doctor Who, the recurring Time Lord villain the Master will sometimes use hypnosis to bring subjects under his control. This is usually achieved by him staring the victim in the eyes and saying, "I am the Master and you will obey me!". In the 1985 story "The Mark of the Rani", the Master uses a pendulum to hypnotize a victim. The Doctor also displays proficiency in the use of hypnosis, requiring only a second glance into a person's eyes or a mind meld like technique to put someone under his spell. Another instance is when the Silence use post-hypnotic suggestions to control the actions of the human race and coax them to launch Apollo 11, all the while hiding their own existence through those same suggestions.
 In the anime Nodame Cantabile, a character nicknamed Nodame uses hypnosis to uncover the traumatic events Chiaki experienced on a plane when he was young, and help him overcome his fear of flying. This allows Chiaki to chase his dreams of becoming a conductor in Europe.
 In the series X-Files, one of the main characters Fox Mulder is able to access repressed memory of his sister's abduction by aliens through regression hypnosis.
 In the Columbo episode "A Deadly State of Mind", a psychiatrist murders his lover by hypnotizing her into believing she can dive safely into a pool from a high balcony.
In the anime Bleach, the main antagonist Sosuke Aizen has a sword which allows him to place anyone who looks at it into a state of perfect hypnosis, which he uses to manipulate others.
 Derren Brown claims to use suggestion as part of his performances in Mind Control with Derren Brown. He has however stated that 'hypnotic techniques' are the result of suggestion and that in reality there is no such thing as a hypnotic trance.                                  
 In Ninjago, a snake tribe called the Hypnobrai have the power of hypnosis.
 Magician/mentalist The Amazing Kreskin disputes the validity of hypnosis, and once offered $100,000 to anyone who could prove to his satisfaction that such a thing as "hypnotic trance" exists.
 In the television series Monk, the season 7 episode "Mr. Monk Gets Hypnotized" has a principal plot involving hypnosis. While investigating the initial disappearance of actress Sally Larkin (Dina Meyer), Adrian Monk is miserable, having not been able to enjoy a double rainbow, and his mood isn't helped when an uncharacteristically upbeat Harold Krenshaw shows up on the scene, saying that he has been cured of his OCD through hypnosis with a new therapist, named Dr. Climan (played by Richard Schiff). Monk, inspired by Harold, tries an appointment with Dr. Climan and it leaves him in a childlike mental state for most of the episode (a state that is described by Dr. Bell as being that he is living the childhood he always wanted), although it proves helpful in breaking some leads in the Sally Larkin kidnapping case. For Harold Krenshaw, however, the hypnosis backfires when it strengthens his feelings of euphoria, causing him to take off all of his clothes in public and get arrested for indecent exposure.
 In the season 3 episode of Gilligan's Island, Mary Ann hits her head and believes she is Ginger. When Mary Ann goes into a traumatic shock from seeing Ginger, the Professor attempts to cure her delusion by hypnotizing her. During the hypnosis session, Gilligan secretly watches and falls under with Mary Ann. The hypnosis doesn't succeed in returning Mary Ann to her original identity, but it causes Gilligan to believe he's Mary Ann. The Professor later uses hypnosis again, this time on Gilligan to return him to his original identity.
 During the season 10 premiere of America's Got Talent, contestant Chris Jones performed a hypnotism act with judge Howie Mandel as the volunteer (who is known to suffer from mysophobia to the point where he never touches anyone's hands unless they are wearing latex gloves) where he was hypnotized and persuaded to shake hands with the contestant and judges Howard Stern, Mel B, and Heidi Klum while no one was wearing gloves. At the time of this post, he has advanced to the Judge Cuts Week stage of the competition. However, he failed to impress the judges during Judge Cuts Week 2 and he was eliminated from the competition.

Online media
 The fictional crime-fighter, The Red Panda, featured on Decoder Ring Theatre, uses a highly fictionalized form of hypnotic power.

See also

Footnotes

References
Bolesław Prus, Pharaoh, translated from the Polish by Christopher Kasparek, 2nd, rev. ed., Warsaw, Polestar Publications, and New York, Hippocrene Books, 2001.

Hypnosis
Topics in popular culture
Medicine and health in fiction
Fiction about mind control
Fiction about hypnosis